In the US, paramedicine is the physician-directed practice of medicine, often viewed as the intersection of health care, public health, and public safety. While discussed for many years, the concept of paramedicine was first formally described in the EMS Agenda for the Future. Paramedicine represents an expansion of the traditional notion of emergency medical services as simply an emergency response system. Paramedicine is the totality of the roles and responsibilities of individuals trained and credentialed as EMS practitioners. These practitioners have been referred to as various levels of Emergency Medical Technician (EMTs). In the United States paramedics represent the highest practitioner level in this domain. Additional practitioner levels in this domain within the U.S. include Emergency Medical Responders (EMRs), Emergency Medical Technicians (EMTs) and Advanced Emergency Medical Technicians (AEMTs).

Profession 
A health profession focused on assisting individuals, families, and communities in the wake of acute or sudden onset of medical emergencies or traumatic events, paramedicine is practiced predominantly in the prehospital setting and is based on the sciences of human anatomy, physiology, and pathophysiology. The goal of paramedicine is to promote optimal quality of life from birth to end of life.

In the United States, such regulated tasks as starting an IV, administering medication, and invasive procedures are performed under the direction of a licensed physician. In the United Kingdom, paramedics practice as independent clinicians under their own licence, as regulated by the Health and Care Professions Council, with complete autonomy to pronounce death, administer controlled drugs, and generally treat patients as they see fit.

Theory 
Paramedicine is based on the emerging concept of paramedic theory, which is the study and analysis of how the three pillars of paramedicine (health care and medicine, public health, and public safety) interact and intersect. As stated in the IoM Report EMS at the Crossroads (2006), EMS is currently highly fragmented and largely separated from the overall health care system. A major emphasis of paramedic theory is the integration of emergency medical services, both intraprofessionally and extraprofessionally. Intraprofessional integration is the study of resource allocation, distribution, deployment and efficiency. Extraprofessional study involves the integration of EMS with the nation's existing (and future) emergency care and health care system.

Other areas of inquiry in paramedic theory include emergency response, response planning, community education, transport medicine, disaster preparedness and response, emergency management, pandemic and epidemic, emergency response planning, special operations, and medical aspects of rescue.

See also 
 Emergency Medical Services in the United States
 Emergency medical personnel in the United Kingdom
 Paramedics in the United States
 Paramedics in Canada
 Paramedics in Australia
 Health science
 Allied health professions
 Alternative medicine

References

External links 
 National Highway Traffic Safety Administration EMS Office
 National Association of Emergency Medical Technicians
 National Registry of Emergency Medical Technicians
 https://web.archive.org/web/20131113190248/http://www.ems.gov/EducationStandards.htm

Emergency medical services